Liv Anna Mjönes (born 18 September 1979) is a Swedish actress. In 1995 at the age of 16 she started studying dancing and acting. She graduated after four years of education at Stockholm Academy of Dramatic Arts in 2006. She is best known for her role as Frida in the Swedish film Kyss Mig.

Filmography

Television

Theatre

External links

1979 births
Living people
Swedish film actresses
Swedish television actresses
Actresses from Stockholm
Dramatiska Institutet alumni